Collamoor Head is a junction on the A39 road where it is met from the west by the B3263 road  in Cornwall, England. It is in the parish of Otterham.

References

Geography of Cornwall